Gente de Zona is a Cuban reggaeton duo made up of musicians Alexander Delgado Hernández and Randy Malcom Martínez. In 2014, the duo gained success with the collaboration of Mario Proenza, who helped them record with Enrique Iglesias the song "Bailando". This hit gave the duo numerous prestigious awards like the Latin Grammy and Latin Billboard Awards.

The Visualízate album was released on April 22, 2016, which contains the single "La Gozadera" featuring Marc Anthony. The album won the category of Tropical Album Of The Year at the 2017 Billboard Latin Music Awards, and three Premio Lo Nuestro awards.

In 2018, Gente de Zona won awards such as the ASCAP Golden Note Award  at the ASCAP Latin Music Awards and the Triunfador Award from La Musa Awards. They also won Tropical Artist of the Year, Duo or Group  at the Billboard Latin Music Awards. Their album En Letra de Otro was also released and includes songs such as "El Rey" and "Cuando Calienta el Sol".

In 2019,  Otra Cosa was released including the single "Te Duele" for which the music video has surpassed more than 93 million views on YouTube. "El Mentiroso" featuring Silvestre Dangond and "Si No Vuelves" were other successful singles.

In 2020, "Muchacha" was released featuring Becky G which had a nomination at the 2021 Premios Lo Nuestro for Pop Collaboration of the Year. On YouTube, the music video has amassed over 60 million views.

In 2021, the group won two prestigious  Latin Grammys at the 22nd Latin Grammy Awards. They won Best Urban Song '' and Song of the Year '' for  "Patria y Vida".  They also performed "Patria y Vida" alongside Yotuel, Descember Bueno and El Funky on the Grammy stage.

2022 began with a nomination in Premios Lo Nuestro for Colaboración del Año- Urbano for "Patria y Vida".

Discography

Albums

Studio albums

Reissued albums

Compilation albums

Singles

As lead artist

As featured artist

Awards and nominations

Notes

References

External links 
 Official website in English
 Official Facebook
 Alexander Delgado Facebook
 Randy Malcom Facebook

Cuban reggaeton musicians
Cuban hip hop groups
Latin Grammy Award winners
Reggaeton duos
Sony Music Latin artists